Key
 Pink is female.
 Blue is male.
 Grey means other or unknown.
 Clans, families, people groups are in green.
 Vital figures are in bold text.

Also see 

 Family tree of Japanese monarchs
 List of Japanese deities
 Kamiumi

References 

Mythology
Shinto
Japanese deities
Japanese deities
Deities